North Devon is a local government district in Devon, England. North Devon Council is based in Barnstaple. Other towns and villages in the North Devon District include Braunton, Fremington, Ilfracombe, Instow, South Molton, Lynton and Lynmouth. The district was formed on 1 April 1974 as a merger of the Barnstaple municipal borough, the Ilfracombe and Lynton urban districts, and the Barnstaple and South Molton rural districts.

The wider geographic area of North Devon is divided between North Devon District and the district of Torridge, based in Bideford.

Population
North Devon is popular with retired people. The 2011 census showed that 18% of residents were aged 15 years and under, 60% were aged 16–64 and 23% were aged 65 and over. This compares to the 20% of the population who were aged 65 and over when the 2001 census was taken. For comparison, the same age distributions across England were 19%, 64% and 17% respectively. Life expectancy for men, at 77.7, is close to the English average. Female life expectancy is good at 83.1, around 1 year above the English average. There is a gap of 6 years in the life expectancy of men in the least deprived fifth of wards and the most deprived fifth.
The region has one of the most ethnically homogenous populations in England, with 97.9% reporting their ethnicity as 'white' in the 2011 census of the population.  However, this is a decrease on the 99.0% of the population who declared themselves to be White on the 2001 census.

Governance

North Devon Council is elected every four years, with currently 43 councillors being elected at each election. From the first election to the council in 1973 to 1987 the council was controlled by independents. This was followed by a period under Liberal Democrat control until the Conservative Party took control at the 2007 election. After the election in 2011 the Conservatives lost their majority  and a coalition between the Liberal Democrats and independents took control of the council although this returned to no overall control in 2015. After the 2019 election the Liberal Democrats regained control of the council outright. The council's main public office is located at Lynton House, Commercial Road, Barnstaple. The name of the council was changed in December 2007 when the word "District" was dropped from its title.

The political composition of the borough has been as follows:

Services
Services provided by North Devon Council to the local community include the administration of council tax and local benefits, the provision of car parking services, the collection of refuse and the recycling of waste, planning and building control, housing services, the provision of sport and leisure facilities, environmental services, business-related services and contingency planning. The council also runs and maintains the North Devon Crematorium.

Electoral wards
The district of North Devon is divided into 25 wards, each returning between one and three councillors. Some wards are coterminous with civil parishes, though most consist of multiple parishes or parts of parishes. The following table lists the electoral wards of North Devon and the associated civil parishes.

Premises
The council's main offices are at the Brynsworthy Environment Centre near Barnstaple (the building is in the parish of Fremington). The council moved there in 2015, having previously been based at the Civic Centre on North Walk in Barnstaple.

Transport
Along with its neighbours to the east, West Somerset, and west, Torridge, North Devon has fairly sparse transport links. The Beeching cuts in the mid-sixties left the branch line to Exeter as the area's only railway service. Despite being served by only one railway line, the district is served by 5 railway stations, which is a large number, comparable with more urbanised boroughs such as Plymouth and Mid Devon.  However sizeable settlements of Braunton and Ilfracombe as well as Bideford are cut off from the Network Rail system.

The district is served by three A roads. The primary link is the A361 (known locally as the Link Road) which was constructed between 1986 and 1989. It heads north-west from the M5 motorway, past South Molton, to Barnstaple. From here the A361 classification continues northwards along older roads to Ilfracombe, and the modern Link Road continues westwards from Barnstaple as the A39 where it is designated the Atlantic Highway, and runs via Bideford into Cornwall. The eastern section of the A39 links Barnstaple to Lynton, then crosses the northern coastal hills of Exmoor into Somerset.

The other two A roads in North Devon are the A399, a minor local route between Ilfracombe and South Molton (used as a de facto Barnstaple-bypass to Ilfracombe and Woolacombe), and the A377, which is the main road between Barnstaple and the county town of Devon, Exeter.

Due to significant peak time traffic delays in Barnstaple, and severe congestion at both peak and non-peak times in the summer when tourist traffic is at its busiest, the Barnstaple Western Bypass was opened in 2007.

Economy

North Devon is some distance from the UK's traditional areas of industrial activity and population yet boasts some major manufacturing sites that export around the world, among them TDK Lambda and Pall Europe in Ilfracombe, Eaton Aerospace and Norbord in South Molton, Perrigo in Braunton and multiple businesses in Barnstaple. Due to the historically agricultural nature of the economy alongside a strong tourism industry employment can be seasonal. As a result, some areas of North Devon are considered deprived. The overall average income for the district is 80% of the average for the United Kingdom as a whole. 
The 1989 opening of the new Link Road connection to the motorway network helped to promote trade, but it had a temporary detrimental effect on a number of distribution businesses. The latter had previously viewed the town as a base for local distribution networks, a need that was removed with an approximate halving of travelling time to the M5 motorway. The region adapted: in 2005 unemployment in North Devon was 1.8–2.4% but in 2018 unemployment in North Devon had come down significantly since its 2010 high to 1.1%. Median weekly full-time pay is £440 per week, the average house price is £230,000 and the number of businesses registered has increased to 4895, up 370 from 2010. 2018 has seen significant Government investment in the area through Coastal Community grants and Housing Infrastructure funds, as well as £83 million to further upgrade the North Devon Link Road.

Because Barnstaple is the main shopping area for North Devon, retail work is a contributor to the economy. There are many chain stores in the town centre and in the Roundswell Business Park, on the western fringe of the town. Tesco has several stores in the area, including a Tesco Extra hypermarket, a large Tesco superstore. There is also a Sainsbury's superstore, a Lidl supermarket. The multimillion-pound redevelopment of the former Leaderflush Shapland works at Anchorwood Bank, and the surrounding area, is creating a conservation area near the River Taw, hundreds of new homes, a commercial retail area with new shops, restaurants and leisure facilities. A new Asda superstore and petrol filling station is part of the redevelopment. The new Asda store opened in November 2016 and the whole scheme will be completed by the end of 2017. On the same side of the river work on a new housing development and Leisure Centre is planned to start in 2019. The largest employer in the region is local and central Government.

Barnstaple
Barnstaple is on the River Taw estuary, and functions both as the main service centre and the administrative centre for North Devon Council. The parish of Barnstaple had a population of 24,033 at the 2011 census. The wider Barnstaple Built-Up Area was estimated to have a population of 32,411 in 2018, whilst the Barnstaple Town Area, which contains satellite settlements such as Bishop's Tawton, Fremington and Landkey, has a population of 46,619 (as of 2020).

See also
 Grade I listed buildings in North Devon
 Grade II* listed buildings in North Devon
 South West Coast Path
 Tarka Trail
Valley of Rocks
 Lee Bay

Notes

References

External links
North Devon Council
North Devon Plus
North Devon AONB
North Devon UK

 
Non-metropolitan districts of Devon